William G. Parrett (born June 4, 1945) is an American businessman and senior manager who has served public, private, governmental, and state-owned clients worldwide. In October 2008, Parrett was elected to the board of directors of UBS AG and, in November 2014, to the Board of Directors of UBS Group AG. In May 2018, he stepped down from this role and was focussing on the position of President of UBS Americas Holding LLC.

Education
Parrett graduated with an undergraduate degree (BBA) in accounting from St. Francis College, New York, in 1967. He then became a certified public accountant.  
In April 2007, he was given an honorary degree of Doctor of Humane Letters by his alma mater.

Career
Parrett was the chairman of the board of the United States Council for International Business from April 2005 through March 2010. Prior to that, Parrett was the CEO of Deloitte Touche Tohmatsu from 2003 until he retired from his position in 2007. In 1995, he founded US Deloitte's Global Financial Services Industry Group. He served on Deloitte's Global Executive Committee from 1999 to 2007. In 1997, he also founded the Global Financial Services Industry Group, which he led as chairman. In UBS, Parrett chaired the Audit Committee since 2009, had been a member of the Corporate Culture and Responsibility Committee since 2012 and member of the Compensation Committee since 2015.

His previous positions include a board membership at the International Chamber of Commerce, chairman of the board of the United Way Worldwide and a trustee of the Catholic University of America.
He has provided service to many of the Deloitte's leading clients serving as an Advisory or Leadership Partner, among others to General Motors, Merrill Lynch & Co., Abbott Laboratories, Metropolitan Life Insurance Company,  Royal Bank of Canada, BASF, Bridgestone Corp., The Charles Schwab Corp.,  Marsh & McLennan Companies and The Procter & Gamble Company.

Other activities and functions
Board member of the Eastman Kodak Company (chairman of the audit committee)
Board member of the Blackstone Group LP (chairman of the audit committee and chairman of the conflicts committee)
Board member of Thermo Fisher Scientific Inc. (chairman of the audit committee)
Member of the Committee on Capital Markets Regulation
Member of the Carnegie Hall Board of Trustees.
As a member of the boards of Kodak, Blackstone Group, and Thermo Fisher Scientific, he is required to publicly report his interests in those companies, amounting approximately to US$4 million, as of 2016.

Family
Wife - Diane Parrett

Daughters - Debra Volpe, Suzie Vallerie, Courtney Balsam, Christie Parrett

Sons - Steven Parrett, Gregory Parrett

Grandchildren - Brooke Volpe, Paige Volpe,
Steven Parrett Jr, Ellie Volpe, Lila Volpe, Sarah Parrett, Ray Vallerie, Cynthia Parrett, Luke Balsam, Dominic Parrett, Connor Balsam

References

Further reading

External links
Curriculum vitae on UBS website

Living people
American financial businesspeople
American corporate directors
American bankers
UBS people
St. Francis College alumni
Catholic University of America trustees
1945 births